This Sporting Life was a culturally iconic Triple J radio comedy programme, created by award-winning actor-writer-comedians John Doyle and Greig Pickhaver, who performed as their characters Roy and HG. Broadcast from 1986 to 2008, it was one of the longest-running, most popular and most successful radio comedy programmes of the television era in Australia. Undoubtedly the longest-running show in Triple J's programming history, it commanded a large and dedicated nationwide audience throughout its 22-year run.

The title This Sporting Life was taken from the novel and 1963 film of the same name.

This Sporting Life was added to the National Film and Sound Archive's Sounds of Australia registry in 2013.

Early years 

Often referred to by its acronym, TSL, the show was a parody of sporting panel programmes, although the duo cast a wide comedic net that encompassed entertainment, politics, celebrity and contemporary Australian culture in general. It was modeled to some extent on the popular 1980s Melbourne radio sports comedy panel show Punter To Punter, which also featured Pickhaver (as HG Nelson) as a panel member and which was primarily concerned with the world of horse and greyhound racing. Interviewed in 2000, John Doyle cited controversial broadcaster John Laws as a major influence:

"We started with This Sporting Life and what we did was anti-commercial. We modeled it, in the early days, on the John Laws show, constant self-promotion and constant promotion of products that were your own."

Although TSL was not an instant hit—some Triple J listeners at first mistook it for a real sports show—it soon found a loyal audience in Sydney, and this grew into a substantial nationwide following in the 1990s as Triple J expanded to become a national network.

TSL was also notable as one of the few successful topical comedy programmes that was substantially improvised. Doyle and Pickhaver would reportedly meet on the morning of the broadcast to discuss the week's events and agree on a general list of topics, but almost all of their discussions were improvised, live to air. The consistent high quality of their humour is doubly remarkable given the show's long-running time of three hours every Sunday afternoon (originally four hours on Saturdays).

Guests and comedy segments 

Aside from their improvised commentary, over the years, This Sporting Life included numerous scripted, pre-recorded segments, such as the topical satire commentaries "The Nelson Report" and "Date's Up, With Roy Slaven".

There was also a series of regular live feature segments; one of the earliest of these was "Tips from the Other Side", in which HG Nelson would list predictions for forthcoming sporting fixtures which had been provided by contacting the spirits of deceased celebrities. According to HG, many of these tips were provided thanks to the spirit of the late British "psychic" Doris Stokes, who acted as an intermediary. During one of these segments it was revealed that the spirits of the Russian Royal Family were avid fans of Rugby league. For several years in the late 1980s the show also featured a weekly satirical roundup of entertainment at local Sydney clubs.

Guests appeared on the programme in the early days, such as comedian Angela Webber in the guise of "punk granny" Lillian Pascoe, but guest appearances were gradually eliminated as the years passed. However the duo maintained an enduring relationship with actor Robbie McGregor who, in the guise of "King Wally Otto in the Soundproof Booth", provided the introduction, links and a wide variety of parodic fake advertisements. Australian Big Brother host Gretel Killeen and actor-comedian Jonathan Biggins have also provided voice-overs for many fake ads, including the ongoing series of fictitious products and services provided by Nelson-Slaven Industries.

In the last few years of the series comedian Chris Taylor from The Chaser filled in for John Doyle, broadcasting alongside HG Nelson on the occasions when Doyle was absent due to "other media commitments".

Aside from the regular improvised discussions and fake ads, one of the show's most enduring features was the listener giveaway segment, "The Fat", two of which occurred per show ("the first Fat of the afternoon", typically open to women only, and "the second Fat of the afternoon", open to all comers). In these competitions, listeners were asked to phone in with the answer to a question sourced from one of that afternoon's wide-ranging and often fantastical discussions of sporting news and personalities, for example: "Who is known as the founding father of Russian rugby league"?

Advertising parodies 

Doyle and Pickhaver wrote dozens of parody advertisements for a vast range of imaginary products and services provided by Roy and HG's numerous fictional companies, most of which were gathered under the Nelson-Slaven Industries banner.

These included services such as the HG Nelson Butchery -- "still doing things with meat other butchers only dream of" -- "Roy's Rectal Ring Balm" (a rectal ointment) and "Happy Jack's Ta-taa Packs" (a body bag), Angus Fraser Paints 'If you've got nothing to say the whole world can hear it' -- as well as innumerable parody books, films and TV series. Other highlights included a long-running series of fake ads for "Istengar", an esoteric branch of yoga that teaches practitioners how to create works of art from their own faeces. Another fake ad (satirising the Nine Network's The Footy Show), promotes Rex Mossop's Rugby League Finishing School, which offers training to footballers hoping to pursue a career in the media.

In later years, real-life sporting stars such as rugby league players Stan Jurd and Paul Sironen also recorded parodic voice-overs for the show promoting fictional bodies such as the "National Rugby League Party", a fictitious political organisation.

In its last years TSL introduced another popular recurring voice-over character, Sydney car dealer Frosty Lahood (voiced by ABC NewsRadio sports reporter David Lord), whose famous "No root: no toot" deal offered customers their money back if the attractive new vehicle (usually a Daewoo Nubira or Hyundai Lantra) did not enable the buyer to "get a root" (i.e. have sex) within 24 hours of purchase.

Another parody was the "Alan Jones Scouts for God" child day-care centre, offering all-day child care for only five dollars. The slogan of the Alan Jones Scouts for God was: "If the kids are happy, and you're happy, there's a fair chance we're happy too".

The South Coast News 

One of the show's most popular scripted segments was "The South Coast News", a parody news bulletin read by real-life journalist and TV presenter Paul Murphy. It ran for several years in the late 1980s and early 1990s and two volumes of scripts were later published in book form, with illustrations by cartoonist Bill Leak, who had an enduring relationship with the duo.

The basic conceit of the sketch was that the small New South Wales south coast town of Ulladulla was heavily populated by famous Australian sporting and show business identities, that many of these celebrities owned businesses in the area or worked in various official capacities in the town, and that all were regularly involved in hilarious and often ribald misadventures.

Prominent recurring characters included the town's mayor, renowned TV composer and conductor Tommy Tycho, former TV wrestler Mario Milano, owner of the Bluebird Cafe, and former NSW Premier Barrie Unsworth, owner of the disreputable 'Cardigan Club'. This fictional Ulladulla also boasted a colossal statue of long-distance swimmer Linda McGill ("The Big Linda", which stood astride the entrance to the boat harbour and featured a revolving restaurant in its head). All the streets were named after sporting or TV stars, and the local high school was named after rugby league player Barry Beath.

Humour and terms 

Much of Roy and HG's comedy is topical, poking fun at current sporting news, the foibles, ego trips and media gaffes of sporting, film and music stars, and the often risible phraseology used by sporting writers and commentators.

Doyle and Pickhaver also interweave their dialogue with a colourful and uniquely Australian form of linguistic comedy that often verges on the obscene, although they very rarely use "four-letter words" unless particularly enraged.

Over the years they have coined many memorable parodic words and terms, while others revive archaic expressions from their youth, and many have since entered the vernacular in Australia.

Many listeners will be familiar with the TSL lexicon, which includes words and phrases such as:

"bed flute" or simply "flute"—the male sex organ
"bugger-all to the power of less"—nothing
"bush-junk"—useless native or introduced wild animals, suitable only for shooting
"date"—anus
"dwahl"—a slump in sporting form or a period of poor performance
"football head"—the Zen-like focus or mindset required to play a good game of footy; underperforming players are often described as not having their football head on
"half dream room, the"—an unconscious state, usually derived from a concussion; HG often claimed certain players were at their best when playing concussed
"horizontal folk dancing"—sexual intercourse
"(Planet) Koozbane"—a perennial Nelson-ism applied to sportspersons who have been stunned by a heavy blow, fall or tackle. The term is believed to derive from the name of the home planet of the alien puppet characters featured on The Muppet Show and Sesame Street
"love-tap"—a blow inflicted on another player (usually during League or ARL games) without the intention of inflicting serious harm
"night-tools"—genital organs
"night-tool work"—sexual intercourse
"room of mirrors, the"—a metaphorical mirror-lined room to which players are (or should be) banished for a period of time, in order to renew their motivation by "taking a long, hard look at themselves"
"set of seven"—one week, in reference to the expression "set of six" (tackles) from Rugby league
"sloop"—penis; the organ is said to be "pointing north" when erect
"stink"—a fight
"Sweet Science, The"—boxing
"yips, the"—a grave condition that adversely affects the performance of professional golfers

The duo are well known for their lengthy, hyperbolic dissertations on the characters of sporting and cultural identities. Roy is renowned for his long-winded and extremely colourful demolition of almost every conceivable aspect of the personality and performance of a sports star with whom he is displeased.

He will often describe the subject as "a hopeless joke", and declare that they are a fool to him/herself and to his/her family, state and country of origin; this climactic phase of his analysis is usually delivered at the top of his voice. Yet, paradoxically, Roy almost invariably concludes these harangues with quiet, amiable remarks on what a nice person the subject is, how much he likes them, and how much he or she has contributed to their particular field of endeavour. This can also be reversed such as when commentating the first Melbourne Grand Prix he praised the track as "the best in the world... superior to Monza, Spa and Hockenheim" which were all "rubbish".  When there was a big crash on the first corner he claimed the track was to blame because it was "a joke".

Although usually more concise than Roy, and typically taking the role of presenter/interviewer who sets out the subject and poses questions for Roy to comment on, HG Nelson has his own unique and colourful editorial style. On many occasions he has described decisions or innovations with which he disagrees as "a hastily cobbled-together farrago". He once promised that he would "walk nude down George Street with a pie on my head" if the outcome of a sporting fixture did not match his prediction, and during one especially memorable rant he denounced golfer Greg Norman as:

"... a hapless water buffalo, wallowing around in the swamp, waiting for the safari to wander by and finish him off".

In his roundup of the 2006 Melbourne Cup, Nelson described the unusual hat he had worn to the event, which was fashioned in the form of a miniature chicken-processing factory, and which automatically dispensed tiny chickens for "the kiddies". The duo have also long been advocates of the concept of employing "celebrity shooters" at racing fixtures—i.e. hiring well-known personalities to 'put down' horses that are badly injured during races and in 2008 they energetically promoted the concept of a national pig-shoot for peace.

TV programming is another favourite target for duo's satire. Responding to the growth in reality TV programming, Roy suggested several innovative new programmes including "Celebrities With Gastric" and "Celebrity Horses With Gastric".

Cricket legend Sir Donald Bradman has long been a target of the duo's satire, and it is now well established—at least according to Roy & HG—that Bradman was a spy for the Japanese during World War II. They have also deduced that, in his twilight years, "The Don" was locked in a shed at the back of his house in Bowral, NSW and forced to sign millions of items of all descriptions in order to capitalise on the inevitably lucrative market in Bradman memorabilia that would emerge after his death.

This Sporting Life Terminology

Roy Slaven 

Another perennial aspect of their comedy is the overweening egotism and impossible achievements of "Rampaging" Roy Slaven, a character who was probably inspired by sports broadcaster and former professional rugby league footballer Rex Mossop, who was famous for his outspoken opinions and hilarious tautologies.

Roy will often begin his commentaries sotto voce as a mocking parody of Sydney radio announcer Alan Jones, but often finishes screaming at the top of his lungs. By his own account, Slaven has represented Australia in every known sport for most of the 20th century, has ridden in every Melbourne Cup (and won most of them) on his ageless mount Rooting King, is on intimate terms with every major sports, TV, music and film personality in modern history, as well as being a close personal friend of many top racehorses and greyhounds.

Roy's tales of sporting achievement are mixed with reminiscences of his youth in Lithgow, his membership of the rambunctious Lithgow Shamrocks rugby league team, and his formative relationship with mentor and coach 'Grassy' Grannal. Doyle gives a strong scatological edge to the Slaven character and Roy's commentaries and recollections often include hilarious anecdotes about celebrities or teammates who were stricken by attacks of vomiting and diarrhoea—invariably referred to by the quaint Australian term "gastric".

Other memorable Slaven recollections have included the assistance he gave to music star Cher during her bout with chronic fatigue syndrome—which included a daily regimen in which Slaven tied Cher to the back of a car and dragged her behind it for several kilometres—and his revelation that American film actress Kim Basinger planned to buy her home town, rename it "Basingerville" and rebuild it as a showpiece of modern sanitary technology where, thanks to a transparent sewerage system, residents could follow their effluent all the way from toilet to outfall.

State of Origin commentaries 

Besides This Sporting Life, Roy and HG also provide radio commentary for Australian rugby league's three annual State of Origin series matches, as well as the NRL and AFL grand finals (dubbed the "Festival of the Boot", parts one and two).

At the opening of each State of Origin match (and the Grand Finals) Roy and HG traditionally drown out the obligatory rendition of the Australian national anthem—typically performed at the actual event by a minor Australian music celebrity—by playing the lugubrious country-and-western song "I Thank You", recorded in 1969 by former boxing champion Lionel Rose.

The choice of this song seems to have been inspired by several interconnected satirical motives—the appalling standard of Rose's vocal performance, the clichéd sentimentality of the lyrics ("When a boy becomes a man, he must do the best he can"), the inherent violence associated with the former boxer, Rose, and the ironic satire implicit in the phenomenon of a former sports champion (with a very poor singing voice) attempting to establish a career in popular music by recording a prosaic genre love song written by a faded 1960s pop star (Johnny Young).

The duo, particularly Slaven's, commentary often features sensationalist over-reactions to the game at hand, such as calling for entire teams of players to be sacked after losses, or even questioning whether certain teams will ever win another match in the future. The commentary is also notable for its overly biased support of whichever team is winning, and the calling of every player on the field by their Roy & HG-assigned nicknames.

On many occasions, the opening minutes of their 'call' have featured Roy's scathing comments on the various celebrities he has encountered at the match, and his vociferous denunciation of the often hilariously bad pre-match and half-time "entertainment", which regularly feature massed displays by large groups of "kiddies" with "ballooowens" (balloons) and stilted performances by imported has-been stars like Billy Idol and Tina Turner, whose only real connection to The Game is the hefty paycheque they receive from the NSWRL for their brief appearances.

Television 

As well as performing 'This Sporting Life' on radio, Doyle and Pickhaver successfully transferred the concept and characters to television. Over the last ten years they have hosted a range of TV incarnations of the TSL format. The huge popularity of one of these, The Dream with Roy and HG, took Roy & HG's unique comedy style to thousands of Australians who had never listened to the radio show or watched the ABC series.

Published recordings 

1993: Tool talk and wise cracks with Roy and HG, a collection of highlights taken from the programme
1993: Pound for Pound 
1993: The Lifetime of Rampaging Roy Slaven 
1995: Roy & HG present Allan Border: cricket's first saint

Recognition at Australian Comedy Awards 

In November 2003, This Sporting Life was named Outstanding Networked Radio Comedy Performance at the inaugural Australian Comedy Awards in Melbourne.

Departure from Triple J and subsequent radio projects 

On 3 December 2008 Triple J announced that Roy and HG would be leaving the ABC after 22 years on air. In a press statement, Triple J manager Linda Bracken said:
"They are more than a radio programme, they have become their own radio comedy genre. It's been a joy and a privilege to work with them."

Although HG Nelson had announced at the end of the previous week's show that they would return on Sunday 7 December for the last programme of the year, it did not go ahead as scheduled and was replaced by a music shift.

Roy and HG began broadcasting on Triple M on 12 January 2009, with a show called The Life presented during drive time at 4pm to 7pm every Monday and Friday on all Triple M stations, excluding Adelaide. Like "This Sporting Life", it was a wideranging sport/comedy show, and also uses some phases from TSL. The series was later cut back to one episode per week, and concluded in May 2011. It was followed by the duo's short Olympics commentary series "Roy & HG's Mardi Gras of Medals", broadcast on Triple M during August 2016.

In 2017 the duo returned to Triple M, presenting "The Sporting Probe", a weekly two-hour program which was also distributed (minus music and advertisements) as a podcast. The series concluded in early December 2018.

In 2019 Roy and HG signed with the Macquarie Sports Radio network and presented a weekly two-hour program, "Just Short of a Length". The series ran throughout 2019 but was terminated towards the end of that year when MSR cancelled all its "talk" content.

In March 2020 Roy and HG finally returned to the ABC after a twelve-year absence when they were commissioned to present a new weekly two-hour program, "Bludging on the Blindside", presented on Saturdays at midday on the ABC Grandstand digital radio channel, on ABC local radio, and as a podcast.

References

External links 

This Sporting Life page on the Triple J site

Australian comedy radio programs
Australian Broadcasting Corporation radio programs
Sports radio in Australia
Sports radio programs